MHQ may refer to:

 The Quarterly Journal of Military History, published by the Weider History Group
 Mahuda Junction railway station, a station in Jharkhand state
 Mariehamn Airport, IATA: MHQ